HLA-DR18 (DR18) is a HLA-DR serotype that recognizes the DRB1*0302 and *0303 gene products. Compared to DR17 which is found at high frequency in Western Europe, DR18 is found more in SE Europe and Central Asia.

Serology

DR18 recognizes the DRB1*0302 and *0303, the thoroughness of recognition is fair, but better than DR3.

Disease associations
DR18 seropositivity is associated with rheumatoid polyarthritis

DRB1*0302 is positively associated with juvenile diabetes, nuclear helicase Mi-2 autoantibodies in inflammatory inclusion body myositis.

Genetic Linkage

HLA-DR18 is genetically linked to DR52 and HLA-DQ2 serotypes. These serotypes
are the result of gene products from the HLA-DRB3* and HLA DQA1*0501 and HLA DQB1*0201 alleles.

References

3